Giuseppe Barcella (13 June 1926 - 8 February 1992) was an Italian philatelist who signed the Roll of Distinguished Philatelists in 1990.

References

Signatories to the Roll of Distinguished Philatelists
Italian philatelists
1926 births
1992 deaths